Zinc finger protein DZIP1 is a protein that in humans is encoded by the DZIP1 gene.

References

Further reading

Biology of bipolar disorder